Zorka Janů (born Zora Babková; 9 July 1921 – 24 March 1946) was a Czech film actress. She was the younger sister of actress Lída Baarová.

Career

Early years (1921–1938)
When she was 12 years old, she appeared in the movie  (Brickmaker's daughter, 1933) alongside her sister who played the principal role. She studied drama at the Prague's Conservatory.

The Virgins' Club (1938–1939)
The year after she acted in the 1938 film  (The Virgins' Club), she got her first big role in the František Čáp and Václav Krška's movie Fiery Summer, about a love triangle between Clare (Janů), who loves a man named Šimon (Svatopluk Beneš), who in turn loves Rose (Lída Baarová). Clare attempts suicide by jumping into the river. Two young men in love with her throw themselves into the torrent to save her, but one of them drowns. During the shooting of Fiery Summer, Zorka Janů fell in love with the writer and poet František Kožík.

World War II (1939–1945)
In the 1940s Zorka Janů appeared in seven movies, among them Baron Münchhausen and Rubens’ Caper. She played a leading role in the movie  (Ladies in Waiting, 1940) about an aging count who forbids his female staff to marry. Her last movie appearance was as Helen in Jiří Slavíček’s Boys and the River (1944).

Final years and death (1945–1946)
After Germany lost the war in 1945, her sister Lída Baarová (mistress of Joseph Goebbels) was imprisoned, and her mother died during the interrogation by the Czech retribution tribunal. Zorka Janů was expelled from work, ostracized, and committed suicide by jumping out of a window.

Legacy
The story of Zorka Janů was told by Adam Georgiev in his 1998 book  (Diary of Lída Baarová's Sister).

Janů was portrayed by Anna Fialová in The Devil's Mistress, a 2016 Czech film about Lída Baarová's acting career and affair with Goebbels.

Filmography
  (Boys and the River, 1944)
  (Believe it or Not, 1941)
  (Jane's Past, 1940)
  (Baron Münchhausen, 1940)
  (Patient of Dr. Hegel, 1940)
  (Ladies in Waiting, 1940)
  (Rubens' Caper, 1940)
  (Fiery Summer, 1939)
  (Hobo Macoun, 1939)
  (What I learned in High School, 1938)
  (The Virgins' Club, 1938)
  (Brickmaker's daughter, 1933)

References

 Georgiev, A. (1998).  (Diary of Lída Baarová’s Sister). Prague, Czech Republic: Petrklíč.

External links
 Movie clips from the Fiery Summer
 Movie clips from Patient of Dr. Hegel

Czech film actresses
Czech stage actresses
1921 births
1946 suicides
Suicides in Czechoslovakia
20th-century Czech actresses
Suicides by jumping in the Czech Republic
Prague Conservatory alumni
People from Prague-West District
1946 deaths
Czechoslovak actresses